Windows 10 is a version of Windows NT and the successor of Windows 8.1. Some features of the operating system were removed in comparison to Windows 8 and Windows 8.1, and further changes in features offered have occurred within subsequent feature updates to Windows 10. Following is a list of these.

Features removed in version 1507: (RTM)

Windows shell 
The charms are removed, and replaced with the Action Center. In Windows Runtime apps, a menu button appears on the title bar that can be used to access the functions that previously required its usage.
Users are no longer able to synchronize Start menu layouts across all devices associated with a Microsoft account. A Microsoft developer justified the change by explaining that a user may have different applications they want to emphasize on each device that they use, rather than use the same configuration across each device. The ability to automatically install a Windows app across all devices associated with an account was also removed.
 Dragging and dropping items from or within the start menu and the list of recent files (accessible from right click on a taskbar shortcut) is no longer possible.

System components 
 User control over Windows Updates is removed (except in enterprise versions). In earlier versions, users could opt for updates to be installed automatically, or to be notified so they could update as and when they wished, or not to be notified; and they could choose which updates to install, using information about the updates. Windows 10 Pro and Enterprise users may be configured by an administrator to defer updates, but only for a limited time. Under the Windows end-user license agreement, users consent to the automatic installation of all updates, features and drivers provided by the service, and implicitly consent "without any additional notice" to the possibility of features being modified or removed. The agreement also states, specifically for users of Windows 10 in Canada, that they may pause updates by disconnecting their device from the Internet.
 Drivers for external (USB) floppy drives are no longer integrated and must be downloaded separately.
 While all Windows 10 editions include fonts that provide broad language support, some fonts for Asian languages (Arabic, Chinese, Hindi, Japanese, Korean, etc.) are no longer included with the standard installation "to reduce the amount of disk space that Windows requires", but are available without charge as optional font packages. When software invokes text in languages other than those for which the system is configured and does not use the Windows font fallback mechanisms designed always to display legible glyphs, Windows displays unsupported characters as a default "not defined" glyph, a square or rectangular box, or a box with a dot, question mark or "x" inside.
 The ability to create MS-DOS bootdisks has been removed. This means the last remnant of MS-DOS (aside from NTVDM in 32-bit editions) has been removed.

Media features 
 Windows Media Center is discontinued, and is uninstalled when upgrading from a previous version of Windows. Upgraded Windows installations with Media Center will receive the paid app Windows DVD Player free of charge for a limited, but unspecified, time. Microsoft had previously relegated Media Center and integrated DVD playback support to a paid add-on beginning on Windows 8 due to the cost of licensing the required DVD playback related patents, and the increasing number of PCs that have no optical drives.

Internet and networking 
 Web browsers can no longer set themselves as a user's default without further intervention; changing the default web browser must be performed manually by the user from the "Default apps" page in Settings app, ostensibly to prevent browser hijacking.
 Parental controls no longer support browsers other than Internet Explorer and Edge, and the ability to control browsing by a whitelist was removed. Also removed was the ability to control local accounts, and the ability to scan a machine for applications to allow and block.

Bundled software 
 The Food & Drink, Health & Fitness, and Travel apps have been discontinued.
 Starting with Windows 10, Microsoft does not offer WinHelp viewer for this (or higher) version. The last version of Windows on which it was possible to open WinHelp files, using a downloadable component, is Windows 8.1.

Features restored in later versions 
 Windows Defender could be integrated into File Explorer's context menu in Windows 8.x, but Microsoft initially removed integration from Windows 10, restoring it in Windows 10 build 10571 in response to user feedback.
The OneDrive built-in sync client, which was introduced in Windows 8.1, no longer supports offline placeholders for online-only files in Windows 10. This functionality was re-added in Windows 10 version 1709, under the name "Files On-Demand".

Features removed in version 1607 

  Cortana can now operate in a feature-limited mode with basic web and device search functionality, if users have not opted into data collection and personalization. On previous versions, a generic "Search" experience without Cortana branding was shown if the user had not granted permission to activate Cortana.
 In April 2016, Microsoft announced that it will no longer allow Cortana web searches to be executed through any other web browser and search engine combination but Microsoft Edge and Bing, intentionally disregarding user settings. Microsoft alleges that other web browsers and search engines results in a "compromised experience that is less reliable and predictable", and that only Microsoft Edge supports direct integration with Cortana within the browser itself.
 The ability to change the Exit Windows, Windows Logoff and Windows Login sounds was hidden in Version 1607, although these features can be enabled by going to the Windows Registry and under the EventLabels folder and setting the value to 0. However, even changing these sounds in the sounds panel has not had any effect since Windows 8.
 Certain features related to embedded advertising in the operating system can no longer be disabled on non-Enterprise or Education versions of Windows 10 using management settings such as Group Policy, including disabling Microsoft Store and Universal Windows Platform apps, "Microsoft consumer experiences" (which pushes tiles to the Start menu advertising promoted Microsoft Store apps, typically following a new installation of Windows 10), Windows Tips, turning off the lock screen (which can optionally display ads as part of "Spotlight" tips), or enforcing a specific lock screen background. Critics argued that this change was meant to discourage Windows 10 Pro from being used in business environments, since Microsoft was reducing the amount of control administrators have over their devices' environments without using an enterprise version of Windows 10.
 The ability to share Wi-Fi credentials with other contacts via Wi-Fi Sense was removed; Wi-Fi passwords can still be synced between devices tied to the same Microsoft account.
Support for AGP video cards was removed in this version without any official announcement. Attempting to use an AGP video card in version 1607 or newer will fail and the card will display error code 43 or run in PCI mode depending on the card and board.

Features removed in version 1703 

 Windows 10 is no longer supported on devices containing an Intel Atom "Clover Trail" system-on-chip. Affected devices may not be upgraded to 1703 or any future feature updates of Windows 10. Microsoft will continue to provide security patches for version 1607 (the build has a long-term support version for enterprise markets) on these devices through January 2023.
 Windows Update will no longer postpone the download of certain critical updates if the device is connected to a network that was designated by the user as being "metered". Although meant to prevent the updates from utilizing data allotments, this behavior had been used as a workaround by users to avoid the requirement for all updates to be automatically downloaded.
The Interactive Service Detection service, introduced in Windows Vista to combat shatter attacks, is removed in 1703.
Briefcase files and shell and sync functionality has been fully removed. Previously it was disabled in Windows 8 but could be enabled with a Registry tweak.

Features removed in version 1709 

 The Syskey utility is removed, with Microsoft citing insecure cryptography and increasing use as ransomware in tech support scams.
 Server Message Block version 1 (SMB1) is disabled by default on version 1709. The Home and Pro editions only disable the SMB1 server but retain the SMB1 client, so they can connect to SMB1 network shares. The Enterprise and Education editions disable the SMB1 entirely. This version of the 30-year-old protocol gained notoriety in the WannaCry ransomware attack, although Microsoft had been discouraging its use even before.
 3D Builder is no longer installed by default. However, it can still be downloaded from Microsoft Store.

Features removed in version 1803 

Games Explorer, first seen in Windows Vista, has been removed. Running the command shell:games will open an error message.
 Language options in Control Panel, first featured in Windows 8, have been moved to Windows Settings.
 By default, Windows 10 no longer automatically backs up the Registry in the RegBack folder. Microsoft recommends using System Restore instead.
  HomeGroup, a home network file sharing feature first introduced in Windows 7, is removed.
 XPS Viewer is no longer installed by default on new installations.
 The Phone Companion app is deprecated, with its functionality moved to the Settings app.

Features removed in version 1809 

 Windows 10 setup made it more difficult to create a local user account not linked to a Microsoft account if the PC is able to connect to the internet during the setup process.
 The Hologram app has been replaced by the Mixed Reality Viewer.

Features removed in version 1903 

 The sync feature of the desktop version of the Messaging app has been removed.
 The "Product alert" button in Microsoft Paint was removed.

Features removed in version 1909 
 Roaming of Taskbar settings is removed.
The Peer Name Resolution Protocol (PNRP) cloud service was removed in Windows 10, version 1809. It's been planned to complete the removal process by removing the corresponding APIs.
The Explorer search box no longer shows the key words for Advanced Query Syntax nor does it populate their values, although the Advanced Query Syntax for Windows Search can still be used.

Features removed in version 2004 
 Certain capabilities of Cortana have been removed, such as music and connected home.
 Windows To Go is removed.
 The Mobile Plans and Messaging apps are removed for non-cellular devices and are not installed by default.

Deprecated features 
Microsoft has published a list of Windows features that are no longer actively developed. Microsoft states that these features may potentially be removed in future updates to Windows 10.
My People in the shell no longer developed. 
Hyper-V vSwitch on LBFO (to be bound via Switch Embedded Teaming)
Package state roaming for UWP apps (being replaced by Azure App Service)
ReFS (volumes can only be created on Windows 10 Pro for Workstations and Enterprise)
Snipping Tool (replaced by Store app Snip & Sketch)
Language Community tab in Feedback Hub
Software Restriction Policies (replaced primarily by AppLocker and Windows Defender Application Control)
System Image Backup
Internet Explorer (permanently disabled by a Microsoft Edge update on SAC versions on February 14, 2023)
Windows Hello Companion Device Framework API for external devices to unlock Windows logon when biometrics are unavailable
Dynamic Disks (will be replaced by Storage Spaces in a future update)
Math Input Panel (will be replaced by Math Recognition in a future update)

See also

References 

Features Removed In
Software features
Microsoft lists
Computing-related lists